Wolfgang Preisendanz (April 28, 1920 – September 29, 2007) was a German philologist and literary critic.

Preisendanz was the winner of the 1988 Kassel Literary Prize.

References

1920 births
2007 deaths
German philologists
20th-century philologists